Pseudanos trimaculatus, the Threespot headstander, is a species of headstander found in Argentina, Brazil, Guyana and Peru.

Pseudanos trimaculatus exhibits a degree of geographical variation, with specimens found in the Amazon basin exhibiting much more conspicuous black spots at the center of their scales than their Essequibo or Orinoco basin counterparts

References
 

Birindelli, Britski, Flavio. New species of Pseudanos Winterbottom, 1980 (Characiformes: Anostomidae), with notes on the taxonomy of P. gracilis and P. trimaculatus. (2012).

Anostomidae
Fish of South America
Fish of Argentina
Fish of Brazil
Fish of Peru
Taxa named by Rudolf Kner
Fish described in 1858